Rhyming slang is a form of slang word construction in the English language. It is especially prevalent among Cockneys in England, and was first used in the early 19th century in the East End of London; hence its alternative name, Cockney rhyming slang. In the US, especially the criminal underworld of the West Coast between 1880 and 1920, rhyming slang has sometimes been known as Australian slang.

The construction of rhyming slang involves replacing a common word with a phrase of two or more words, the last of which rhymes with the original word; then, in almost all cases, omitting, from the end of the phrase, the secondary rhyming word (which is thereafter implied), making the origin and meaning of the phrase elusive to listeners not in the know.

Examples 
The form of Cockney slang is made clear with the following example. The rhyming phrase "apples and pears" is used to mean "stairs". Following the pattern of omission, "and pears" is dropped, thus the spoken phrase "I'm going up the apples" means "I'm going up the stairs".

The following are further common examples of these phrases:

In some examples the meaning is further obscured by adding a second iteration of rhyme and truncation to the original rhymed phrase. For example, the word "Aris" is often used to indicate the buttocks. This is the result of a double rhyme, starting with the original rough synonym "arse", which is rhymed with "bottle and glass", leading to "bottle". "Bottle" was then rhymed with "Aristotle" and truncated to "Aris".

Phonetic versus phono-semantic forms 
Ghil'ad Zuckermann, a linguist and revivalist, has proposed a distinction between rhyming slang based on sound only, and phono-semantic rhyming slang, which includes a semantic link between the slang expression and its referent (the thing it refers to). An example of rhyming slang based only on sound is the Cockney "tea leaf" (thief). An example of phono-semantic rhyming slang is the Cockney "sorrowful tale" ((three months in) jail), in which case the person coining the slang term sees a semantic link, sometimes jocular, between the Cockney expression and its referent.

Mainstream usage 
The use of rhyming slang has spread beyond the purely dialectal and some examples are to be found in the mainstream British English lexicon, although many users may be unaware of the origin of those words.
 The expression "blowing a raspberry" comes from "raspberry tart" for "fart".
 Another example is "berk", a mild pejorative widely used across the UK and not usually considered particularly offensive, although the origin lies in a contraction of "Berkeley Hunt", as the rhyme for the significantly more offensive "cunt".
 Another example is to "have a butcher's" for to have a look, from "butcher's hook".

Most of the words changed by this process are nouns, but a few are adjectival, e.g., "bales" of cotton (rotten), or the adjectival phrase "on one's tod" for "on one's own", after Tod Sloan, a famous jockey.

History 
Rhyming slang is believed to have originated in the mid-19th century in the East End of London, with several sources suggesting some time in the 1840s.  The Flash Dictionary of unknown authorship, published in 1921 by Smeeton (48mo), contains a few rhymes. John Camden Hotten's 1859 Dictionary of Modern Slang, Cant, and Vulgar Words likewise states that it originated in the 1840s ("about twelve or fifteen years ago"), but with "chaunters" and "patterers" in the Seven Dials area of London. Hotten's Dictionary included the first known "Glossary of the Rhyming Slang", which included later mainstays such as "frog and toad" (the main road) and "apples and pears" (stairs), as well as many more obscure examples, e.g. "Battle of the Nile" (a tile, a vulgar term for a hat), "Duke of York" (take a walk), and "Top of Rome" (home).

It remains a matter of speculation exactly how rhyming slang originated, for example, as a linguistic game among friends or as a cryptolect developed intentionally to confuse non-locals. If deliberate, it may also have been used to maintain a sense of community, or to allow traders to talk amongst themselves in marketplaces to facilitate collusion, without customers knowing what they were saying, or by criminals to confuse the police (see thieves' cant).

The academic, lexicographer and radio personality Terence Dolan has suggested that rhyming slang was invented by Irish immigrants to London "so the actual English wouldn't understand what they were talking about."

Development 

Many examples of rhyming slang are based on locations in London, such as "Peckham Rye", meaning "tie", which dates from the late nineteenth century; "Hampstead Heath", meaning "teeth" (usually as "Hampsteads"), which was first recorded in 1887; and "barnet" (Barnet Fair), meaning "hair", which dates from the 1850s.

In the 20th century, rhyming slang began to be based on the names of celebrities — Gregory Peck (neck; cheque), Ruby Murray [as Ruby] (curry), Alan Whicker [as "Alan Whickers"] (knickers), Puff Daddy (caddy), Max Miller (pillow [pronounced ]), Meryl Streep (cheap), Nat King Cole ("dole"), Britney Spears (beers, tears), Henry Halls (balls) — and after pop culture references — Captain Kirk (work), Pop Goes the Weasel (diesel), Mona Lisa (pizza), Mickey Mouse (Scouse), Wallace and Gromit (vomit), Brady Bunch (lunch), Bugs Bunny (money), Scooby-Doo (clue), Winnie the Pooh (shoe), and Schindler's List (pissed). Some words have numerous definitions, such as dead (Father Ted, "gone to bed", brown bread), door (Roger Moore, Andrea Corr, George Bernard Shaw, Rory O'Moore), cocaine (Kurt Cobain; [as "Charlie"] Bob Marley, Boutros Boutros-Ghali, Gianluca Vialli, oats and barley; [as "line"] Patsy Cline; [as "powder"] Niki Lauda), flares ("Lionel Blairs", "Tony Blairs", "Rupert Bears", "Dan Dares"), etc.

Many examples have passed into common usage. Some substitutions have become relatively widespread in England in their contracted form. "To have a butcher's", meaning to have a look, originates from "butcher's hook", an S-shaped hook used by butchers to hang up meat, and dates from the late nineteenth century but has existed independently in general use from around the 1930s simply as "butchers". Similarly, "use your loaf", meaning "use your head", derives from "loaf of bread" and also dates from the late nineteenth century but came into independent use in the 1930s.

Conversely usages have lapsed, or been usurped ("Hounslow Heath" for teeth, was replaced by "Hampsteads" from the heath of the same name, starting ).

In some cases, false etymologies exist. For example, the term "barney" has been used to mean an altercation or fight since the late nineteenth century, although without a clear derivation. In the 2001 feature film Ocean's Eleven, the explanation for the term is that it derives from Barney Rubble, the name of a cartoon character from the Flintstones television program many decades later in origin.

Regional and international variations 
Rhyming slang is used mainly in London in England but can to some degree be understood across the country. Some constructions, however, rely on particular regional accents for the rhymes to work. For instance, the term "Charing Cross" (a place in London), used to mean "horse" since the mid-nineteenth century, does not work for a speaker without the lot–cloth split, common in London at that time but not nowadays. A similar example is "Joanna" meaning "piano", which is based on the pronunciation of "piano" as "pianna" .  Unique formations also exist in other parts of the United Kingdom, such as in the East Midlands, where the local accent has formed "Derby Road", which rhymes with "cold".

Outside England, rhyming slang is used in many English-speaking countries in the Commonwealth of Nations, with local variations. For example, in Australian slang, the term for an English person is "pommy", which has been proposed as a rhyme on "pomegranate", pronounced "Pummy Grant", which rhymed with "immigrant".

Rhyming slang is continually evolving, and new phrases are introduced all the time; new personalities replace old ones—pop culture introduces new words—as in "I haven't a Scooby" (from Scooby Doo, the eponymous cartoon dog of the cartoon series) meaning "I haven't a clue".

Taboo terms 
Rhyming slang is often used as a substitute for words regarded as taboo, often to the extent that the association with the taboo word becomes unknown over time. "Berk" (often used to mean "foolish person") originates from the most famous of all fox hunts, the  "Berkeley Hunt" meaning "cunt"; "cobblers" (often used in the context "what you said is rubbish") originates from "cobbler's awls", meaning "balls" (as in testicles); and "hampton" (usually "'ampton") meaning "prick" (as in penis) originates from "Hampton Wick" (a place in London) – the second part "wick" also entered common usage as "he gets on my wick" (he is an annoying person).

Lesser taboo terms include "pony and trap" for "crap" (as in defecate, but often used to denote nonsense or low quality); to blow a raspberry (rude sound of derision) from raspberry tart for "fart"; "D'Oyly Carte" (an opera company) for "fart"; "Jimmy Riddle" (an American country musician) for "piddle" (as in urinate), "J. Arthur Rank" (a film mogul), "Sherman tank", "Jodrell Bank" or "ham shank" for "wank", "Bristol Cities" (contracted to 'Bristols') for "titties", etc. "Taking the Mick" or "taking the Mickey" is thought to be a rhyming slang form of "taking the piss", where "Mick" came from "Mickey Bliss".

In December 2004 Joe Pasquale, winner of the fourth series of ITV's I'm a Celebrity... Get Me Out of Here!, became well known for his frequent use of the term "Jacobs", for Jacob's Crackers, a rhyming slang term for knackers i.e. testicles.

In popular culture 
Rhyming slang has been widely used in popular culture including film, television, music, literature, sport and degree classification.

In university degree classification 

In the British undergraduate degree classification system a first class honours degree is known as a "Geoff Hurst" (First) after the English 1966 World Cup footballer. An upper second class degree (a.k.a. a "2:1") is called an "Attila the Hun", and a lower second class ("2:2") a "Desmond Tutu", while a third class degree is known as a "Thora Hird" or "Douglas Hurd".

In film 
Cary Grant's character teaches rhyming slang to his female companion in Mr. Lucky (1943), describing it as 'Australian rhyming slang'. Rhyming slang is also used and described in a scene of the 1967 film To Sir, with Love starring Sidney Poitier, where the English students tell their foreign teacher that the slang is a drag and something for old people. The closing song of the 1969 crime caper, The Italian Job, ("Getta Bloomin' Move On" a.k.a. "The Self Preservation Society") contains many slang terms.

Rhyming slang has been used to lend authenticity to an East End setting. Examples include Lock, Stock and Two Smoking Barrels (1998) (wherein the slang is translated via subtitles in one scene); The Limey (1999); Sexy Beast (2000); Snatch (2000); Ocean's Eleven (2001); and Austin Powers in Goldmember (2002); It's All Gone Pete Tong (2004), after BBC radio disc jockey Pete Tong whose name is used in this context as rhyming slang for "wrong"; Green Street Hooligans (2005). In Margin Call (2011), Will Emerson, played by London-born actor Paul Bettany, asks a friend on the telephone, "How's the trouble and strife?" ("wife").

Cockneys vs Zombies (2012) mocked the genesis of rhyming slang terms when a Cockney character calls zombies "Trafalgars" to even his Cockney fellows' puzzlement; he then explains it thus: "Trafalgar square – fox and hare – hairy Greek – five day week – weak and feeble – pins and needles – needle and stitch – Abercrombie and Fitch – Abercrombie: zombie".

The live-action Disney film Mary Poppins Returns song "Trip A Little Light Fantastic" involves Cockney rhyming slang in part of its lyrics, and is primarily spoken by the London lamplighters.

Television 

Slang had a resurgence of popular interest in Britain beginning in the 1970s, resulting from its use in a number of London-based television programmes such as Steptoe and Son (1970–74); and Not On Your Nellie (1974–75), starring Hylda Baker as Nellie Pickersgill, alludes to the phrase "not on your Nellie Duff", rhyming slang for "not on your puff" i.e. not on your life. Similarly, The Sweeney (1975–78) alludes to the phrase "Sweeney Todd" for "Flying Squad", a rapid response unit of London's Metropolitan Police. In The Fall and Rise of Reginald Perrin (1976–79), a comic twist was added to rhyming slang by way of spurious and fabricated examples which a young man had laboriously attempted to explain to his father (e.g. 'dustbins' meaning 'children', as in 'dustbin lids'='kids'; 'Teds' being 'Ted Heath' and thus 'teeth'; and even 'Chitty Chitty' being 'Chitty Chitty Bang Bang', and thus 'rhyming slang'...). It was also featured in an episode of The Good Life in the first season (1975) where Tom and Barbara purchase a wood-burning range from a junk trader called Sam, who litters his language with phony slang in hopes of getting higher payment. He comes up with a fake story as to the origin of Cockney Rhyming slang and is caught out rather quickly. In The Jeffersons season 2 (1976) episode "The Breakup: Part 2", Mr. Bentley explains Cockney rhyming slang to George Jefferson, in that "whistle and flute" means "suit", "apples and pears" means "stairs", "plates of meat" means "feet".

The use of rhyming slang was also prominent in Mind Your Language (1977–79), Citizen Smith (1977–80), Minder (1979–94), Only Fools and Horses (1981–91), and EastEnders (1985–). Minder could be quite uncompromising in its use of obscure forms without any clarification. Thus the non-Cockney viewer was obliged to deduce that, say, "iron" was "male homosexual" ('iron'='iron hoof'='poof'). One episode in Series 5 of Steptoe and Son was entitled "Any Old Iron", for the same reason, when Albert thinks that Harold is 'on the turn'. Variations of rhyming slang were also used in sitcom Birds of a Feather, by main characters Sharon and Tracey, often to the confusion of character, Dorian Green, who was unfamiliar with the terms.

One early US show to regularly feature rhyming slang was the Saturday morning children's show The Bugaloos (1970–72), with the character of Harmony (Wayne Laryea) often incorporating it in his dialogue.

Music 
In popular music, Spike Jones and his City Slickers recorded "So 'Elp Me", based on rhyming slang, in 1950.  The 1967 Kinks song "Harry Rag" was based on the usage of the name Harry Wragg as rhyming slang for "fag" (i.e. a cigarette). The idiom made a brief appearance in the UK-based DJ reggae music of the 1980s in the hit "Cockney Translation" by Smiley Culture of South London; this was followed a couple of years later by Domenick and Peter Metro's "Cockney and Yardie". London-based artists such as Audio Bullys and Chas & Dave (and others from elsewhere in the UK, such as The Streets, who are from Birmingham) frequently use rhyming slang in their songs.

British-born M.C. MF Doom released an ode entitled "Rhymin' Slang", after settling in the UK in 2010. The track was released on the 2012 album JJ Doom album Keys to the Kuffs.

Another contributor was Lonnie Donegan who had a song called "My Old Man's a Dustman".  In it he says his father has trouble putting on his boots "He's got such a job to pull them up that he calls them daisy roots".

Literature 
In modern literature, Cockney rhyming slang is used frequently in the novels and short stories of Kim Newman, for instance in the short story collections "The Man from the Diogenes Club" (2006) and "Secret Files of the Diogenes Club" (2007), where it is explained at the end of each book.

It is also parodied in Going Postal by Terry Pratchett, which features a geriatric Junior Postman by the name of Tolliver Groat, a speaker of 'Dimwell Arrhythmic Rhyming Slang', the only rhyming slang on the Disc which does not actually rhyme. Thus, a wig is a 'prunes', from 'syrup of prunes', an obvious parody of the Cockney syrup from syrup of figs – wig.  There are numerous other parodies, though it has been pointed out that the result is even more impenetrable than a conventional rhyming slang and so may not be quite so illogical as it seems, given the assumed purpose of rhyming slang as a means of communicating in a manner unintelligible to all but the initiated.

In the book Goodbye to All That by Robert Graves, a beer is a "broken square" as Welch Fusiliers officers walk into a pub and order broken squares when they see men from the Black Watch. The Black Watch had a minor blemish on its record of otherwise unbroken squares. Fistfights ensued.

In Dashiell Hammett's The Dain Curse, the protagonist exhibits familiarity with Cockney rhyming slang. referring to gambling at dice with the phrase "rats and mice."

Cockney rhyming slang is one of the main influences for the dialect spoken in A Clockwork Orange (1962). The author of the novel, Anthony Burgess, also believed the phrase "as queer as a clockwork orange" was Cockney slang having heard it in a London pub in 1945, and subsequently named it in the title of his book.

Sport 
In Scottish football, a number of clubs have nicknames taken from rhyming slang. Partick Thistle are known as the "Harry Rags", which is taken from the rhyming slang of their 'official' nickname "the jags". Rangers are known as the "Teddy Bears", which comes from the rhyming slang for "the Gers" (shortened version of Ran-gers). Heart of Midlothian are known as the "Jambos", which comes from "Jam Tarts" which is the rhyming slang for "Hearts" which is the common abbreviation of the club's name. Hibernian are also referred to as "The Cabbage" which comes from Cabbage and Ribs being the rhyming slang for Hibs.

In rugby league, "meat pie" is used for try.

See also 

 Argot
 Costermonger
 Euphemism
 Daffynition
 Navvy slang
  Nickname

References

Further reading

External links 
 "Having a barney", bulletin board discussion at Phrases.org.uk
 To Sir With Love, on YouTube.com

London society
English language in England
English-based argots
English language in London
Language games
Rhyme